East Hants, officially named the Municipality of the District of East Hants, is a district municipality  in Hants County, Nova Scotia, Canada. Statistics Canada classifies the district municipality as a municipal district.

With its administrative seat in Elmsdale, the district municipality occupies the eastern half of Hants County from the Minas Basin to the boundary with Halifax County, sharing this boundary with the West Hants Regional Municipality. It was made in 1861 from the former townships of Uniacke, Rawdon, Douglas, Walton, Shubenacadie and Maitland. Its most settled area is in the Shubenacadie Valley.

Demographics 

Public Works
The Public Works division operates two water utility distribution sites and three sewage collection and treatment systems for communities in the serviced areas adjacent to Highway 102 and along the Shubenacadie River. The division also operates an engineered spring which draws additional water from Grand Lake to the Shubenacadie River during low water level events.
 
Drinking water is distributed across 71.0 kilometers of main distribution lines. Wastewater is distributed through 80.5 kilometers of wastewater collection mains. Please visit the Public Works section for more detailed information.
 
The Environmental Services division works closely with Public Works. This division monitors and reviews data to ensure compliance of operating approvals. Environmental Services also runs a watershed protection program that focuses on building awareness of watershed issues that impact watersheds of interest to the municipality.

Notable people
 Hip hop artist Buck 65 is from Mount Uniacke, East Hants. Born Richard Terfry, he is also a radio host on CBC Radio.
 Luke Boyd, international recording artist better known as Classified, was born in Enfield, East Hants.

Communities

Education
 Riverside Educational Centre middle school is located in Milford Station
 Elmsdale District School is located in Elmsdale
 Kennetcook District Elementary is located in Kennetcook
 Uniacke District School is located in Mount Uniacke
 Hants East Rural High School is located in Milford Station
 Hants North Rural High School is located in Kennetcook
Cobequid District School is located in Noel
Rawdon District School is located in Rawdon

See also

 List of municipalities in Nova Scotia

References

External links

East Hants
East Hants
1879 establishments in Canada